Deh-e Nur Mohammad Khan (also Romanized as Deh-e Nūr Moḩammad Khān; also known as Deh-e Nūr Moḩammad and Nūr Moḩammad Khān) is a village in Qorqori Rural District, Qorqori District, Hirmand County, Sistan and Baluchestan Province, Iran. At the 2006 census, its population was 180, in 38 families.

References 

Populated places in Hirmand County